Miguel Cruchaga Tocornal (born 4 May 1869–3 May 1949) was a Chilean politician and lawyer who served as President of the Senate of Chile.

External links
 BCN Profile

1869 births
1949 deaths
Chilean people
Chilean politicians
Conservative Party (Chile) politicians
Presidents of the Senate of Chile